Justin DuJian Tuggle (born January 4, 1990) is an American Canadian football linebacker for the Toronto Argonauts of the Canadian Football League (CFL). He was signed by the Houston Texans as an undrafted free agent in 2013. He played college football at Kansas State. Tuggle is the son of former five-time Pro Bowl linebacker Jessie Tuggle. He is also the brother of Atlanta Falcons defensive tackle Grady Jarrett.

Early years
Tuggle attended Northview High School in the state of Georgia. He earned the Greater Atlanta All-Area honors in his senior season. He participated in the second annual Offense-Defense All-American Bowl and was the quarterback on the east team. He was selected to the 2007 All-North Fulton County team and was on the second-team offense as a quarterback.

College career
Tuggle played his freshman season at Boston College where he played quarterback. In his sophomore season, he transferred to Blinn College for the spring semester.  After spending his sophomore season at Blinn College, he transferred to Kansas State. He switched positions from quarterback to linebacker for his junior season and first season at Kansas State.

Professional career

Houston Texans
On April 27, 2013, he signed with the Houston Texans as an undrafted free agent. in 42 games over 3 seasons, Tuggle produced 71 tackles, forced one fumble, and intercepted an Andrew Luck pass which he returned for 8 yards.

Cleveland Browns
On March 11, 2016, Tuggle signed with the Cleveland Browns. On September 3, 2016, he was released by the Browns.

Toronto Argonauts
On May 23, 2017, Tuggle signed with the Toronto Argonauts. During his first year in the CFL, Tuggle recorded three sacks, a defensive touchdown, a forced fumble, and an interception, as well as being part of the 105th Grey Cup championship team. The following season, Tuggle played in 17 games. Due to injuries to the struggling Argos, Tuggle was a starter at three different positions during the 2018 season, playing at middle linebacker, weakside linebacker, and along the defensive line. Tuggle put up a career high 36 tackles, along with three more sacks and two more forced fumbles.

Hamilton Tiger-Cats
Toronto's rival, the Hamilton Tiger-Cats, signed Tuggle as a free agent in February 2019. He played in 18 regular season games where he had 80 defensive tackles, one special teams tackle, one quarterback sack, and one interception. He also played in both post-season games, including the 107th Grey Cup where he had four defensive tackles in the loss to the Winnipeg Blue Bombers.

Edmonton Football Team
Upon entering free agency, Tuggle signed with the Edmonton Football Team on February 11, 2020. However, he did not play in 2020 due to the cancellation of the 2020 CFL season and he became a free agent again on February 9, 2021.

Toronto Argonauts (II)
On October 1, 2021, it was announced that Tuggle had signed with the Toronto Argonauts.

Personal life
His father is Jessie Tuggle who played in the National Football League for the Atlanta Falcons from 1987–2000.  He also was selected to five Pro Bowls and three All-Pro teams during his career. His brother, Grady Jarrett is a defensive tackle for the Atlanta Falcons. Tuggle has also released three single albums and one album consisting of 14 songs (including all three singles) titled Life on Beats by YGP (Tuggle's teammate Terrance Plummer) & take1.

References

External links
[ Toronto Argonauts bio]
Houston Texans bio 
Kansas State Wildcats bio 
Boston College Eagles bio

1990 births
Living people
People from Alpharetta, Georgia
Players of American football from Georgia (U.S. state)
American football quarterbacks
American football outside linebackers
Canadian football defensive linemen
African-American players of American football
African-American players of Canadian football
Boston College Eagles football players
Blinn Buccaneers football players
Kansas State Wildcats football players
Houston Texans players
Cleveland Browns players
Toronto Argonauts players
Sportspeople from Fulton County, Georgia
Hamilton Tiger-Cats players
21st-century African-American sportspeople